Macintosh XL is a modified version of the Apple Lisa personal computer made by Apple Computer. In the Macintosh XL configuration, the computer shipped with MacWorks XL, a Lisa program that allowed 64 K Macintosh ROM emulation. An identical machine was previously sold as Lisa 2/10 with the Lisa OS only.

Hardware
Macintosh XL has a 400K 3.5" floppy drive and an internal 10 MB proprietary "Widget" hard drive with provision for an optional 5 or 10 MB external ProFile hard drive with the addition of a parallel interface card. The machine uses a Motorola 68000 CPU, clocked at 5 MHz together with 512 KB RAM. Macintosh XL was discontinued in April 1985.

Upgrades
Because of its roots as a Lisa — unlike all other Macintosh computers — the stock Macintosh XL used rectangular pixels. The resolution of Macintosh XL's 12-inch (30.5 cm) display was 720×364 pixels. Square pixels were available through the Macintosh XL Screen Kit upgrade that changed the resolution to 608×432 pixels.  The CPU could be replaced with a new CPU board containing up to 8 MB RAM, called XLerator 18. The maximum upgraded RAM with conventional add-in RAM cards was up to 2 MB – quadruple the maximum capacity of earlier Macintosh computers. (With modifications to the CPU board, the XL could accommodate up to 4 MB of RAM).

MacWorks
MacWorks Plus was developed by Sun Remarketing as a successor to MacWorks XL in order to provide application compatibility with the Macintosh Plus computer. MacWorks Plus added support for an 800 KB 3.5" floppy disk and System software up through version 6.0.3. MacWorks Plus II extended that to the same System 7.5.5 limit imposed on all 68000 processors.

History
After two years of lackluster sales, Apple attempted to salvage Lisa by redesigning some hardware components and renaming it as Macintosh XL. Basing on the previous sale figures of Lisa, Apple ordered the limited number of parts as to last through 1985 before ending the production. The redesign spurred a record number of orders for this addition to the Macintosh line, which caught Apple off-guard.

Discontinuation
Due to the limited number of parts ordered, Apple had sold its entire allocations of Macintosh XL for 1985 much earlier than anticipated. Had Apple continued to manufacture Macintosh XL as to meet the demand at lower price, the company would have lost even more money on each unit. Additionally, the cancellation was also due to the necessary consolidation of expenses and projects. In 1986, Apple offered the exchange program for the owners of Lisa and Macintosh XL. The owners could exchange their Lisa and Macintosh XL along with $1,495 US for the new Macintosh Plus and Hard Disk 20 (list price of $4,098 US).

Sun Remarketing
After Apple dropped the XL from their price list in September 1985, Sun Remarketing of Logan, Utah, bought a number of Apple's remaining inventory and continued to sell them under license with their updated version of MacWorks Plus, re-branding it as Macintosh Professional.

Although no new Lisas were available for sale, development continued on MacWorks Plus to support the installed base of Lisas, making them as relevant as their closely-related cousin Macintosh Plus.

Legacy
Macintosh XL shares the same legacy as Lisa before it. However, the increased sales from the emulation of the Macintosh operating system proved that the Macintosh family badly needed a more professional environment which could support larger monitors, greater memory, and more expandability than Macintosh 512K offered.

Timeline

See also
Macintosh 128K
Macintosh 512K
Macintosh Plus

References

XL
XL
Computer-related introductions in 1985